Andrainjato is a town and commune in Madagascar. It belongs to the district of Ambalavao, which is a part of Haute Matsiatra Region. The population of the commune was estimated to be approximately 6,000 in the 2001 commune census.

Only primary schooling is available. Farmers make up 98% of the commune's population, while an additional 1% receives their livelihood from raising livestock. The most important crop is rice, while other important products are onions and tobacco. Services provide employment for 1% of the population.

References and notes 

Populated places in Haute Matsiatra